The Hudson Riverfront 9/11 Memorial, also known as the Weehawken 9/11 Memorial, is a memorial in Weehawken, New Jersey. It commemorates the '9/11 boat lift', the emergency rescue response, and those who perished (including five Weehawken residents) in the aftermath the September 11 attacks of the World Trade Center in 2001. It is located on the Hudson River Waterfront Walkway at the site of triage which had been set up on the left bank of Hudson River and was dedicated ten years after the events of that day.

Description

The memorial includes two trident-shaped beam recovered from the World Trade Center (WTC) set vertically into an infinity pool, a fountain, and a commemorative plaques. They weigh 50,000 pounds. They serve as visual reference to the parts buildings that withheld and outlasted the damage; Seating at the oval shaped park orients the viewer to the site of the former buildings in Lower Manhattan.

Tridents
An iconic architectural feature of exterior of WTC was three-pronged decorative and structural elements at its base, commonly referred to as "tridents", for their three-tine fork-like shape. The tridents were formed by massive steel beams rising from the base of the towers along the exterior walls. At the seventh story, the aluminum-clad beams divided into three smaller beams that continued to the 110th floor of each tower. They were produced by Lukens Steel Company, and nicknamed "trees".
After the attacks, several sections of the towers' lower facade remained standing. They were eventually dismantled and stored in Hangar 17 at JFK Airport along with other artifacts.

One trident is at the entrance of the Terrorist Screening Center in Vienna, Virginia. Two of the tridents have been re-assembled in the interior of the National September 11 Memorial & Museum. Others have been returned to Coatesville, Pennsylvania, where they were manufactured, as a memorial at the National Iron and Steel Heritage Museum.

Inscription
The inscription includes a quote from President John F. Kennedy:

"The courage of life is often a less dramatic spectacle than the courage of a final moment; but it is no less a magnificent mixture of triumph and tragedy."

Significance
Thousands of people were transported across the Hudson River by commercial ferry boats, tug boats, police and fire boats and passenger vessels in the maritime evacuation of Lower Manhattan. Hundreds, including injured emergency personnel, office workers and civilians, were severely burned, injured or emotionally traumatized. The memorial's location near Weehawken Port Imperial was a site where approximately 60,000 people were brought (mostly by NY Waterway and Circle Line Sightseeing Cruises boats) and a triage was quickly established.

Hudson River Walkway 9/11 memorials

There are other memorials along the Hudson River Waterfront Walkway, namely at Pier A, Hoboken, the Jersey City 9/11 Memorial at Paulus Hook/Exchange Place, Empty Sky at Liberty State Park, and To the Struggle Against World Terrorism in Bayonne.

See also
National September 11 Memorial & Museum
Memorials and services for the September 11 attacks

References

External links

Boatlift (film)

Memorials for the September 11 attacks
Weehawken, New Jersey
Monuments and memorials in New Jersey
Buildings and structures in Hudson County, New Jersey
Tourist attractions in Hudson County, New Jersey
2011 establishments in New Jersey
Public art in Hudson County, New Jersey